Andrew Ogletree (born April 3, 1998) is an American professional golfer from Union, Mississippi. He won the 2019 U.S. Amateur.

Amateur career
Ogletree attended Union High School in Union, Mississippi, leading his team to the Mississippi state championship in 2016. He also won the individual state championship that year. In 2015 he reached the quarter-finals of the U.S. Junior Amateur and qualified for the U.S. Amateur for the first time.

Ogletree began attending Georgia Tech in 2016. In 2019, his senior year, he won the Monroe Invitational by two shots with a score of 279 (−1). In August, he won the U.S. Amateur at Pinehurst, defeating John Augenstein of Vanderbilt, 2 and 1, in the championship match. Ogletree was the third Georgia Tech player to win the title, joining Bobby Jones (five times) and Matt Kuchar. By winning the Havemeyer Trophy, he earned exemptions into the 2020 Masters Tournament, U.S. Open and Open Championship. Ogletree was the low amateur at the 2020 Masters.

Professional career
Ogletree turned professional shortly after the 2020 Masters in November. In his first event as a professional, he finished tied for 46th place at the Mayakoba Golf Classic. Ogletree missed the cut in his first three events in 2021 and then had hip surgery. 

In June 2022, Ogletree played in the first event of the LIV Golf Invitational Series. Despite his conditional status on the Korn Ferry Tour not gaining him entry to play in any PGA Tour sanctioned tournament that week, he was not granted a release to play in the LIV Golf event by the tour and subsequently suspended from all PGA Tour sanctioned events until January 2023. He didn't play any further part in the LIV Golf series during 2022, but through playing in the first event he was granted exemptions into the Asian Tour's International Series events. In November 2022, he won his first tournament as a professional at the International Series Egypt, giving him a two year exemption on the Asian Tour.

Amateur wins
2013 Evitt Foundation RTC Junior All-Star
2016 Cardinal Amateur
2019 Monroe Invitational, U.S. Amateur

Source

Professional wins (2)

Asian Tour wins (2)

Results in major championships
Results not in chronological order in 2020.

LA = Low amateur
CUT = missed the half-way cut
"T" = tied 
NT = No tournament due to COVID-19 pandemic

U.S. national team appearances
Amateur
Walker Cup: 2019 (winners)
The Spirit International Amateur Golf Championship: 2019

References

External links

Georgia Tech profile

American male golfers
LIV Golf players
Georgia Tech Yellow Jackets men's golfers
Golfers from Mississippi
People from Newton County, Mississippi
1998 births
Living people